Hans Haasmann (6 January 1916 – 26 May 2008) was a Dutch diver. He competed in the men's 3 metre springboard event at the 1936 Summer Olympics where he placed 15th overall

References

External links
 

1916 births
2008 deaths
Dutch male divers
Olympic divers of the Netherlands
Divers at the 1936 Summer Olympics
Sportspeople from Jakarta